Dolph may refer to:

People

Given name or nickname 
 Dolph Briscoe (1923–2010), Governor of Texas from 1973 to 1979
 Dolph Camilli (1907–1997), American Major League Baseball player
 Dolph Eckstein (1902–1963), American football player
 Dolph Heinrichs (1883–1967), Australian rules footballer
 Dolph Lundgren (born 1957), Swedish actor
 Dolph Pulliam (born 1946), American former basketball player and television sportscaster
 Dolph Schayes (1928–2015), National Basketball Association Hall of Fame player and coach
 Dolph Sweet (1920–1985), American actor
 Dolph van der Scheer (1909–1966), Dutch speed skater who competed in the 1936 Winter Olympics

Surname 
 Charles L. Dolph (1918–1994), American professor of mathematics
 Cyrus A. Dolph (1840–1914), American businessman
 John Henry Dolph (1835–1903), American painter
Joseph N. Dolph (1835–1897), U.S. Senator from Oregon from 1883 to 1895

Stage or ring name 
Young Dolph (1985–2021), American rapper
Dolph Ziggler, a ring name of American professional wrestler Nick Nemeth (born 1980)

Fictional characters 
 Dolph the Fascist Hippo, in a Danish cartoon strip and TV cartoon
 Dolph Starbeam, a recurring character in The Simpsons

Places 
 Dolph, Arkansas, an unincorporated community
 Dolph, Michigan
 Dolph, Oregon, an unincorporated community

See also 
 Dolf (disambiguation)

Lists of people by nickname
Hypocorisms